Nestor Jacono (15 February 1925 – 4 May 2014) was a Maltese athlete who competed in the Men's 100 metres sprint at the 1948 Summer Olympic Games held in London, United Kingdom.

In 2005 he was included in the Hall of Fame of the Maltese Olympic Committee.

Before he died in May 2014, he was the Maltese oldest living Olympian.

References

External links
 

1925 births
2014 deaths
Athletes (track and field) at the 1948 Summer Olympics
Olympic athletes of Malta
Maltese male sprinters